The term Fat Elvis originally referred to the later years of Elvis Presley.  It may also refer to:

 A character in the British soap opera EastEnders
 Lance Berkman, American baseball player nicknamed "Fat Elvis"
 The Fat Elvis, a 1993 album by Big Boys